Discount may refer to:

Arts and entertainment
Discount (band), punk rock band that formed in Vero Beach, Florida in 1995 and disbanded in 2000
Discount (film), French comedy-drama film
"Discounts" (song), 2020 single by American rapper Cupcakke

Economics and business
Discounts and allowances, reductions in the basic prices of goods or services
Discounting, a financial mechanism in which a debtor obtains the right to delay payments to a creditor
Delay discounting, the decrease in perceived value of receiving a good at a later date compared with receiving it at an earlier date
Discount store